Ioannis Nakitsas or Pakitsas (Greek: Ιωάννης Νακίτσας or Πακίτσας, died 1906) was a Greek chieftain of the Macedonian Struggle from Gramos, Western Macedonia, Greece, then part of the Ottoman Empire.

Biography 
Ioannis Nakitsas was born in the end of the 19th century in Gramos. He acted as the chieftain of a guerilla band in the areas of Korestia and Kastoria, against Bulgarian komitadjis. He collaborated in various operations with Georgios Tsontos.

He settled in Kastoria, where served as head of the executive of the National Organization of Kastoria. On 23 October 1906 he visited his wife in Sdraltsi (now Ampelokipi) of Kastoria. He was noticed by the Turks, who notified the army. Despite his attempt to escape, an Ottoman detachment, after encircling the village, shot and killed him. He was buried in Kastoria.

References 

Greek people of the Macedonian Struggle
1906 deaths
Year of birth missing
People from Kastoria (regional unit)
Greek Macedonians